Angakban (also Romanized as Angakbān and Engakbān; also known as Angalkabān and Enkakvān) is a village in Hasanabad Rural District, Hasanabad District, Eqlid County, Fars Province, Iran. At the 2006 census, its population was 378, in 73 families.

References 

Populated places in Eqlid County